The  was an infantry division of the Imperial Japanese Army. It was formed 15 June 1944 in southern Luzon as a C(hey)-class security division. The nucleus for the formation was the 33rd Independent Mixed Brigade and Kawashima detachment. The division was initially assigned to the 14th area army

Action
Initially the 105th division was garrisoning from Manila to Bicol Region. Prior to the Battle of Luzon, various detachments were sent north, particularly to Lamon Bay. Largest of these units is known as "Noguchi detachment". Although some of the detachments have fought in Cagayan during the Battle of Luzon since January 1945 and were forced to retreat to the Kiangan, Ifugao, the bulk of the 105th division has survived until surrender of Japan 15 August 1945.

See also
 List of Japanese Infantry Divisions
 Independent Mixed Brigades (Imperial Japanese Army)

Notes and references
This article incorporates material from Japanese Wikipedia page 第105師団 (日本軍), accessed 27 June 2016
 Madej, W. Victor, Japanese Armed Forces Order of Battle, 1937-1945 [2 vols], Allentown, PA: 1981.

Japanese World War II divisions
Infantry divisions of Japan
Military units and formations established in 1944
Military units and formations disestablished in 1945
1944 establishments in Japan
1945 disestablishments in Japan